The family of Aufseß, sometimes spelt Aufsees and Aufsess, is a Franconian noble family of barons. The original family seat was at Unteraufseß castle in Aufseß, Upper Franconia.

Members of this family held important Roman Catholic Church posts in Bamberg. 
Jobst Bernhard von Aufsees (28 March 1671 – 2 April 1738), also known as Jodocus, canon of Bamberg and Würzburg, was born in Mengersdorf. He was baptized as a Lutheran but educated as a Roman Catholic and was later the founder of the Aufseesianum in Bamberg.
Friedrich III von Aufseß was Prince-Bishop of Bamberg from 1421 to 1431.

In 1852 Hans von und zu Aufseß was the principal founder of the Germanisches Nationalmuseum (formerly the "Germanischen Museums") in Nuremberg.

References

External links
 Catholic Encyclopedia Article
 www.aufseesianum.de (Studienseminar Aufseesianum)
 Jobst Bernhard von Aufsees in Ahnensaal of Schloss Unteraufseß

Franconian nobility